Métis buffalo hunting began on the North American plains in the late 1700s and continued until 1878. The great buffalo hunts were subsistence, political, economic, and military operations for Métis families and communities living in the region. At the height of the buffalo hunt era, there were two major hunt seasons: summer and autumn. These hunts were highly organized, with an elected council to lead the expedition. This made sure the process was fair and all families were well-fed and provided for throughout the year.

Nomenclature
Though there are no buffalo species that are indigenous to the Americas, the Michif term for bison is lii bufloo. Bison are not a species of the Bubalina subtribe that includes all of the true buffalo species, but American bison have been known as buffalo since 1616 when Samuel de Champlain applied the term buffalo (buffles in French) to the species, based on skins and drawings shown to him by members of the Nipissing First Nation who had traded with other First Nations that hunted them. There is a very closely related bison species indigenous to Europe, called the European bison (also known as wisent or the European wood bison), however, it's very likely that the early European explorers had never seen nor heard of a European bison as they were essentially extirpated from Western Europe during the Middle Ages.

Early history
Métis buffalo hunting began in the late 18th century. Trading companies working on the plains sought out food items that could last their traders on long trips; pemmican can be stored for long periods of time without spoiling, which made it an ideal product. The Métis commercialized their hunts to engage in trade and supply pemmican to these companies. In these early days buffalo herds still lived in close proximity to the communities, so Métis families in the Red River region could conduct their hunting and trading individually without needing to travel. As settler and Métis populations grew, the buffalo moved further away and hunts increasingly grew in size and scale to keep up with demand and provide for their expanding communities. These changes brought a new organization to the buffalo hunts, with Métis families forming parties to travel in safety.

Buffalo hunts
The Metis buffalo hunts were held at two times during a year by the Métis of the Red River settlements during the North American fur trade. The buffalo hunt out of Red River region had three major parties: the Pembina Métis, the Métis of St. Boniface, also known as the Main River party, and the St. Francois Xavier Métis. The Métis of St. Boniface, situated on the banks of the Red River of the North in what is now the city of Winnipeg, Manitoba, Canada, formed the largest contingent of these hunts; composed of a summer hunt and an autumn hunt. By the 1830s, every major hunt had a common form and governance structure. The largest-scale buffalo hunts began a decade later. For the summer hunts, the three parties would gather at Pembina to organize before continuing on to the buffalo hunting grounds.

All members of the family participated in the hunt in some way; the faster the buffalo meat could be processed and preserved meant less potential for spoilage as a result of changing weather conditions. Men were typically the hunters, while women were responsible for maintaining the camps, preparing and preserving the buffalo meat. A successful hunt could bring in thousands of buffalo.

Summer hunts
The summer buffalo hunt, otherwise known as the dried meat hunt, traditionally occurred from June to late July or early August. When the season began, the Métis, after sowing their fields in the spring, set out with their wives and children leaving a few behind to take care of the crops. The warmer temperatures made this season ideal for producing dried meat, pemmican, and buffalo tongue, which the Métis would trade most often with the Hudson Bay company.

In 1840 the settlement had over 4,800 people of which 1,630 took part in the summer hunt and headed south on the prairie. Often harassed by the Sioux, the Métis from the various settlements of Red River travelled in large groups for protection. Another smaller portion of the population would join the York boat brigades including the Portage La Loche Brigade heading north.

In 1879 the hunters on the prairies of Canada reported that only a few buffalo were left of the great herds and two years later the last of the buffalo herds in the Montana Territory were also gone.

Paul Kane, an Irish-born Canadian painter, witnessed and participated in the Métis buffalo hunt of 1846.  Several of his paintings depict scenes of this hunt in the Sioux lands of the Dakota Territory in the United States of America.

The summer hunts increased in size from 540 Red River carts in the 1820 summer hunt, 689 carts in 1825, 820 in 1830, 970 in 1835 and 1210 carts in 1840.

In 1823 William H. Keating described a group of buffalo hunters he encountered at Pembina by the Red River. The group had a total of 300 people and consisted of 115 Red River carts and at least 200 horses. These men, he wrote,  are Gens libres or freemen and are not Engagés or servants who are employed by the Hudson's Bay Company. The Métis among them are called Bois brulés.

Their horses are from the southern prairies or from New Spain having been traded and re-traded until they come into their possession. The buffalo runner, a horse bred for speed and intelligence, was used principally for the hunt. Often its saddle and trappings were decorated with beads and porcupine quills and for the hunt its mane and tail were intertwined with multicolored ribbons.

Leaving Fort Garry on June 15, 1840 were 1210 Red river carts, 620 hunters, 650 women, 360 boys and girls, 403 buffalo runners (horses), 655 cart horses, 586 draught oxen and 542 dogs in the hunting expedition. In three days they reached their rendezvous at Pembina  to the south and set up a tent city.
The carts were set up to form a solid defensive circle with forks facing out. Within the circle the tents were set up in rows on one side and, facing the tents, the animals on the other side. The animals are kept outside when deemed safe.

At Pembina a count was taken of those taking part (1,630 in 1840), a general council was held and leaders were chosen. Ten captains were chosen in 1840 Jean Baptiste Wilkie being chosen as the war chief and the president of the camp. Each captain had ten soldiers under them. Ten guides were also chosen. A smaller council of the leaders was also held to lay down the rules or laws of the hunt.

On July 3, sighting buffalo  further, 400 mounted hunters killed about 1,000. In carts the women then arrived to cut up the meat and haul the pieces back to the camp. It took the women several days to prepare the dried meat. The camp then moved on to another site.

In 1849 there were two summer hunts from the Red River. The St. Francois Xavier (White Horse Plain) group alone numbered 700 Métis, 200 Indians, 603 carts, 600 horses, 200 oxen and 400 dogs.

Isaac Stevens of the US Pacific Railroad Surveys (1853-1854) who camped near the Red River hunters near Devil's Lake, North Dakota in 1853 (July 16) provided a description of the 1853 summer hunt.
The hunt was led by Jean Baptiste Wilkie and had 1,300 people, 1,200 animals and 824 carts. The camp consisted of 104 tepees, most shared by two families, arranged within a circle of carts which covered in skins provided additional sleeping quarters. The animals are driven into the circle at night and 36 men stand guard on the sleeping camp.

Six days later Stevens group encountered another hunting group led by Urbain Delorme of St. Francois Xavier. Delorme led this group, that averaged 500 carts, for 25 consecutive years.

Autumn hunt 
The autumn hunt started in September and ended in late October or early November. When the hunters returned about half of the pemmican and dried meat was kept for their winter provision and the rest sold to the Hudson's Bay Company at Fort Garry. The hunters also had some fresh meat (preserved by the cold). This hunt was smaller than the summer hunt as many of the hunters, the hivernants or winterers, who had taken part of the summer hunt leave the settlements to pass the winter on the Prairies with their families to trap and hunt. The early fall was also the harvest season, so more family members were needed to remain at home to farm (Ens).

Some of the products of these hunts, especially prime buffalo robes taken from November to February, also found their way by the Red River Trails to the American Fur Company at Fort Snelling and exchanged for dry goods such as sugar, tea and ammunition.

Sioux conflicts

During the 1840s and 1850s the Métis followed the buffalo herds further into the Dakota Territory bringing them into conflict with the Sioux. Cuthbert Grant, an early captain of the buffalo hunt, negotiated a treaty in 1844. Another treaty was concluded in 1851 and another in 1854 but Métis hunting groups were still being attacked by the Sioux. Jean Baptiste Wilkie, the leader of the 1840, 1848 and the 1853 summer hunt, helped negotiate a peace treaty in 1859 and another in 1861 between the Métis, Chippewa and the Sioux (Dakota) to set hunting boundary lines. These peace overtures did not last and conflict continued between the Métis and the various Sioux groups even after the Dakota War of 1862.

In the 1848 summer hunt the hunting group, made up of 800 Métis led by Jean Baptiste Wilkie and 200 Chippewa led by Chief Old Red Bear and over 1,000 carts, met the Sioux in the Battle of O'Brien's Coulée near Olga, North Dakota.

Between July 13 and 14, 1851 a large band of Sioux attacked the St. François Xavier hunting camp in North Dakota on the Grand Missouri Coteau resulting in the last major battle, the Battle of Grand Coteau (North Dakota), fought between the two groups. The Métis were victorious.

The St. Boniface group, accompanied by Father Albert Lacombe, made rendezvous with the Pembina group (June 16) then travelled west to meet the St. François Xavier group (June 19). There were 1,300 people, 1,100 carts and 318 hunters in the combined groups. The groups hunted separately but planned to unite against any threat from the Sioux.

The St. François Xavier (White Horse Plain) group led by Jean Baptiste Falcon, son of Pierre Falcon, and accompanied by its missionary, Father Louis-François Richer Laflèche, numbered 200 carts and 67 hunters plus women and children. In North Dakota on the Grand Coteau of the Missouri on July 12 the scouts of St. François Xavier spotted a large band of Sioux. The five scouts riding back to warn the camp met with a party of 20 Sioux who surrounded them. Two made a run for it under fire but 3 were kept as captives. Two would escape the next day and one killed. On Sunday July 13 the camp was attacked by the Sioux. Lafleche dressed only in a black cassock, white surplice, and stole, directed with the camp commander Jean Baptiste Falcon a  miraculous defence against the 2,000 Sioux combatants holding up a crucifix during the battle. After a siege of two days (July 13 and 14) the Sioux withdrew convinced that the Great Spirit protected the Métis.

Present at the Battle of Grand Coteau, fighting by their father's side, were 17-year-old Isadore Dumont who died at the Battle of Duck Lake 34 years later and 13-year-old Gabriel Dumont who commanded the Métis forces in the North-West Rebellion of 1885.

Hunt governance
To ensure their success, the buffalo hunts had a set of leaders and other positions such as scouts, soldiers, and lookouts. Each hunt had a chief and council that would be elected amongst the families of the three Métis hunting brigades. At the rendez-vous at Pembina, a count was taken of those taking part (In 1840, the number was 1,630). There would then be a vote by popular assembly, where the heads of major Métis families would select the principal hunt chief and 10 to 12 councillors, or hunt captains. Each captain had ten soldiers under them. Ten guides were also chosen. A smaller council of the leaders was also held to lay down the rules or laws of the hunt. The chief and council was a decentralized and non-coercive government with limited authority; if there was any decision that went beyond the scope of authority given to them, hunt law required that they consult with the heads of households. The Métis believe in self-ownership while also being community and kin-focussed, so this style of leadership allowed for both familial independence and collective organization.

Laws of the buffalo hunt
In 1840, the following hunt rules were put in place to ensure no hunter would act greedily or harm the other members of the brigade in any way.

This leadership and legal structure evolved to become part of a system of self-government for the Métis communities. For example, in 1873 the Southbranch settlements organized a form of local government, under Gabriel Dumont, based on the laws of the buffalo hunt.

Egalitarian practices during the hunt
The Laws of the Buffalo Hunt allowed for a structured and regulated approach to the hunt. These laws were targeted at behaviours that could seriously affect the hunt for all members, such as people opportunistically hunting bison ahead of the camp that could result in scaring the herds, the herds running away, and making the hunt more difficult for the whole party. These laws also reinforced the communal nature of the hunts and the egalitarian values of the Métis society. This included communal sharing of the animals killed so that every family would receive enough meat to support itself, regardless of how many animals were killed by any one person. In addition, the hunt chief would make at least one free pass through the herd, and any animal that he killed was to be given to the old and sick who were unable to hunt for themselves. The practices ensured that there was an equal interest in the success of the hunt by enforcing equity among families, and recognizing both familial independence and interdependence.

Pemmican trade
 Converting the buffalo into bags of pemmican the Métis would bring them north to trade at the North West Company posts. After the North West Company was absorbed by the Hudson's Bay Company most of the pemmican was sold to the Hudson's Bay Company at Red River.

The smaller buffalo cow was the main target of the hunt. A bag of pemmican or a taureau (lit. These bags of taureaux (lit. 'bulls') when mixed with fat from the udder were known as taureaux fins, when mixed with bone marrow as taureaux grand and when mixed with berries as taureaux à grains.

The Hudson's Bay Company depended on the products of the buffalo hunts well into the 1870s. Samuel MacKenzie, the factor of Île-à-la-Crosse, ordered provisions for the passing brigades in 1871. The list included 240 bags of common pemmican ( each), 8 bags of fine pemmican ( each), 10 bags of hard grease ( each) and 1 bag of soft grease for the Île-à-la-Crosse Post and an additional 29 bags of common pemmican, 1 bag of fine pemmican and 1 bag of hard grease was ordered for the Portage La Loche Post. 
 
For these people on the edge of the prairie the pemmican trade was as important a source of trade goods as was the beaver trade for the Indians further north. This trade was a major factor in the emergence of a distinct Métis society. Packs of pemmican would be shipped north and stored at the major fur posts: Fort Alexander, Cumberland House, Île-à-la-Crosse, Fort Garry, Norway House, and Edmonton House. So important was pemmican that, in 1814, governor Miles Macdonell nearly started a war (Pemmican War) with the Métis when he passed the short-lived Pemmican Proclamation, which forbade the export of pemmican from the Red River Colony.

Buffalo robe trade

The winter hunts from Red River began in the early 19th century when the population included less than 200 Scottish and Irish settlers, about 100 De Meurons soldiers and a growing number of French voyageurs, descendants of North West Company employees now freemen, and their families. Most spent the winters in Pembina hunting buffalo.

In 1823 Pembina was found to be just south of the Canada–United States border and in 1844 Norman Kittson opened a successful trading post at Pembina in competition with the Hudson's Bay Company at Red River.
By 1849 the Hudson's Bay Company had lost its fur trade monopoly (the result of the Sayer Trial) and the Métis could now freely sell their furs. As the price of buffalo robes increased so did the number of carts heading south from Pembina to St. Paul, Minnesota each year: from 6 carts in 1844 to 400 carts in 1855, 600 to 800 carts in 1858 and 2,500 carts in 1869. Most of this freight was in buffalo robes (25,000 in 1865 alone).

A buffalo robe is a cured buffalo hide, with the hair left on. Only hides taken in the winter hunts between November and March when the furs are in their prime were suitable for buffalo robes. The summer hides had little value to traders and neither were the hides of bulls.

Hivernants settlements

To exploit the demand for buffalo robes many more Métis would spend the winter on the prairie. From the 1840s to the 1870s Métis hivernants hunting camps were established at Turtle Mountain, on the Souris River, Riding Mountain, Wood Mountain, on the Assiniboine, in the Qu'Appelle valley, on the North and South Saskatchewan rivers, in the Cyprus Hills, on the Battle River, on the Red Deer River, and in Montana.

New permanent settlements were also founded. They were similar to the settlements of the Red River set on river lots. They also organised their own summer, autumn and winter hunts. St. Albert, established in 1861 by Father Lacombe, became the main staging area for the French Métis buffalo hunters of the Fort Edmonton area including the missions of Lac la Biche and Lac St. Anne. From 300 people in 1864 St. Albert grew to 1,000 in 1870. English Métis from the Victoria settlement northeast of St. Albert also organised hunts. In Saskatchewan Gabriel Dumont was the leader of the hunt for his group of 200 hunters living in the Southbranch settlements on the South Saskatchewan River from 1863 to the end of the buffalo hunts.

The St. Albert fall hunt of 1872 found the majority of the hunters still on the prairies experiencing an October blizzard. They found refuge on Buffalo Lake (Lac du boeuf) where they spent the winter. Buffalo Lake and the Red Deer River valley nearby would become an hivernant settlement with over 80 cabins frequented by both the hunting groups of St. Albert and the Southbranch Settlements. The last of the hunts in 1877 and 1878 were failures and Buffalo Lake, perhaps the largest of the hivernants settlements, was abandoned.

Buffalo herds

There were two great herds hunted by the hunters of Red River, those of the Grand Missouri Coteau and the Red River of the North and those of the Saskatchewan River. Other great herds existed south of the Missouri River.

The Missouri Coteau, or Missouri Plateau, is a plateau that stretches along the eastern side of the valley of the Missouri River in central North Dakota and north-central South Dakota in the United States and extends into Saskatchewan and Alberta in Canada. The Missouri Coteau can also refer to a line of rolling hills on the eastern edge of the Missouri Plateau.

References

External links
 Bison Hunting http://www.metismuseum.ca/media/document.php/00716.VM%20-%20Bison%20Hunting.pdf
Metis Bison Hunters (Canadian Museum of Civilization)
Paul Kane (Artist as Buffalo hunter)
The Bison Hunt (The Many Uses of the Bison)
Songs of Old Manitoba (2) Pierre Falcon: The Buffalo Hunt and The Dickson Song
Image of Red River Camp in 1853
John Mix Stanley (American, 1814–1872), Camp of the Red River Hunters, 1857
Red River Settlement by Paul Kane c. 1848
Metis camp at night, with Red River carts in circle. 1859

Bison hunting
Indigenous peoples of the Great Plains
History of the American West
People
Red River Colony
Dakota Territory
19th century in North America
American frontier